The Fort Campbell Children's Theatre was established in 1970 as a branch of Fort Campbell Community Theatre, part of the Fort Campbell Morale Welfare Music & Theatre Program. Fort Campbell, Kentucky, is located on the border between Tennessee and Kentucky. Its post office is in Kentucky. The neighboring communities are Clarksville in Tennessee and Oak Grove and Hopkinsville in Kentucky.

History 
The Fort Campbell Children's Theatre was established in 1970 as part of the Morale Welfare Music and Theatre program.  It resided in a World War II building on Indiana Avenue for several years until the building was required for other military purposes.  After that, plays were held in the Soldier Show Center, also on Indiana Avenue, as well as the Cabaret Dinner Theatre.  The Cabaret Dinner Theatre was first located on Indiana Avenue, and later moved to a larger facility which had been the former recreation hall of the old hospital.  The Halloween and Christmas plays were usually held in the larger facility due to their popularity and the additional events held in conjunction with these programs, such as costume contests and visits from Santa.

The cast and crew of the plays were children who lived on Fort Campbell and in the surrounding areas.  Most were Army family members, although residents of the community were also welcome.  Rehearsals and performances were held after school, usually beginning at 4 p.m., and performances were also held at 2 p.m. on weekends.  The directors were staff members of the Music and Theatre program, as well as some guest directors.

The head of the Music & Theatre Program at Fort Campbell was Lionel Austell, the Post Entertainment Director, who established the Music & Theatre program in 1967. Robert L. Taylor, a theatre specialist who had previously worked as a director at the Nashville Children's Theatre, organized the Children's Theatre program shortly after joining the staff at Fort Campbell. Taylor also directed plays for adults, which were presented in the Soldier Show Center and in the Cabaret Dinner Theatre.

The Children's Theatre was active for nearly 16 years, until the dissolution of the Music & Theatre program in 1986. Many of the plays were original adaptations of stories and fairy tales in the public domain, and some were totally original. After the initial launch, Heide Hepler, who was music specialist with the Music & Theatre program, shared management of the Children's Theatre with Taylor. Approximately 8-10 children's plays were presented annually.

Billy St. John, a theatre specialist and a published author of plays, gave technical support with set design, costuming, lighting and other advice regarding the Children's Theatre. St. John's duties were primarily in the adult productions of the Soldier Show Center and the Cabaret Dinner Theatre; although an important element of the Children's Theatre, he was not one of the regular directors.

Lilo Rogoish, a family member, became costume designer and seamstress for many of the Children's Theatre productions as well as the adult plays held at the other theatres.  Upon dissolution of the Music and Theatre program, Rogoish became head costume designer for the theatre program at Austin Peay State University in Clarksville, TN.

Productions 
Both Hepler and Taylor wrote original plays, adapted plays in public domain, and produced and directed published plays for the Children's Theatre. All acting and technical roles were filled by children and teenagers in the local area, with occasional technical support from adults, often parents and soldiers who were volunteers with the theatre program. Participation as performers, technicians and audience members was open to residents of the surrounding communities as well as the military and their family members residing on- and off-post.  This was part of the community relations incentive of the installation.

Special costumes were provided from the inventory of the Soldier Show Center, designed and created by staff members and parents, and were often commissioned. Lilo Rogoish, a community member and costume designer, often created costumes for the Children's Theatre as well as Soldier Show Center and Cabaret Dinner Theatre productions. When the Music and Theatre program closed, Rogoish became head of the costume department of the theatre program at Austin Peay State University in Clarksville.

Taylor and Hepler often collaborated on original musicals, including The Witch Who Went West, a Halloween production, and The Toymaker, a Christmas production.  The script and lyrics were written by Taylor, with music composed by Hepler. Dr. Charles H. Ball, professor of music education at the University of Tennessee in Knoxville, collaborated with the two on the music of The Witch Who Went West and provided a soundtrack to be used with the production.

Additional plays adapted by Taylor include Coppélia, The Steadfast Tin Soldier, Pinocchio, Swan Lake and Sleeping Beauty. Adaptations written by Hepler include Alice in Wonderland, Through the Looking Glass, Hansel and Gretel and The Pied Piper.

Andre La France, a soldier stationed at Fort Campbell, served as guest director for the production of his original play, Princess Tina. Megan Hepler, nine years old, played the title role.  The Children's Theatre occasionally sponsored playwriting contests, with the winning entries being produced at the theatre.

Halloween and Christmas plays 
Halloween, Christmas, and other special occasion productions were popular at the Children's Theatre.

The annual Halloween production, usually directed by Hepler, started with a play that was followed by a costume contest, door prizes and refreshments. The Witch Who Went West, a musical collaboration with book and lyrics by Taylor, music by Hepler and soundtrack by Dr. Ball, was the story of a young witch who became bored with her life and decided to go west to find new adventures.

The Christmas production was directed by Taylor. One of the plays was his original, The Toymaker, also a musical collaboration, featured two of Santa's elves whose job it is to make toys for Christmas delivery by using a large Toymaker machine. "Junk" goes into one side and beautiful toys come out on the other. When the Toymaker breaks just before delivery time, the elves have the dilemma of trying to fix the machine so that everything will be on schedule.

Touring plays 
In 1984, the Children's Theatre organized a tour of the Disney children's musical version of Alice in Wonderland to all the elementary schools at Fort Campbell. The soundtrack was pre-recorded by all the children who performed in the play. Parents helped to shuttle the cast members and set pieces from school to school for nearly a week. All cast members were excused from their regular attendance by participating schools in order to participate in the tour.

One year the Children's Theatre presented short skits and comedy routines on a portable stage for the annual Fort Campbell Fourth of July Celebration. The popular celebration, open to all residents of the surrounding communities, also included games, static displays, food and a band concert, followed by fireworks. The event was always held at a post parade field.

Closing of the Children's Theatre  
The Children's Theatre was a popular venue at Fort Campbell until the termination of the Music & Theatre Program in 1986. After that, plays, including plays for children, were sometimes presented at Dale Wayrynen Recreation Center at Fort Campbell.

References 
Interview: St. John (Interview with Billy St. John, Clarksville, TN, 22 April 2013)

Children's theatre
Theatres in Kentucky